XHMNU-TDT is an educational television station owned and operated by the Universidad Autónoma de Nuevo León (UANL) in Monterrey, Nuevo Leon.

Programming on XHMNU generally consists of educational telecourse programs for UANL students, plus public affairs, documentary and cultural programming.

History
XHMNU-TV was one of the first university-run broadcast stations in Mexico, signing on channel 53 in June 1990 under the auspices of the School of Mechanical and Electrical Engineering at UANL. Its purpose was to serve as a field laboratory for students studying communications engineering. The station's first broadcast was a message from Governor Jorge Treviño Martínez. Programming was supplied by other schools, such as the School of Communication and of Philosophy and Letters. The Central Directorate for Audiovisual Communication coordinated the production of newscasts.

In 2001, XHMNU-TV came under the aegis of the rector of the university. On September 24, 2003, XHMNU moved its transmitter and drastically increased its power to 500 kW to cover the entire Monterrey metropolitan area. The next year, an agreement between UANL and Cablevisión Monterrey put channel 53 on cable in the city.

XHMNU is operated by the university's Center for Broadcast Communication and Production, which is also responsible for the production and operation of university publications and XHUNL-FM 89.7.

On September 24, 2015, XHMNU shut off its analog signal; its digital signal on UHF channel 35 remained. With digital television, XHMNU briefly began using virtual channel 35 but returned to 53 in October 2016. In October 2015, XHMNU was authorized to raise the power of its station to 250 kW; the digital station had previously broadcast with 40 kilowatts ERP.

Programs

Own production 
 Contigo de 9 a 10 y mas..
 Deportes 53
 Peinate una sonrisa
 NotiUni
 Desde Colegio Civil
 Oriéntate
 Acción Legal
 Vertientes de la Psique Humana
 Laboratorio Escénico
 Entre Libros

Radio production 
 De la peña al antro
 Radio 89.7 TV
 Caminito de la escuela (taped)
 Lo mejor de Radio en TV

References

External links

Public television in Mexico
Autonomous University of Nuevo León
Television channels and stations established in 1990
Television stations in Monterrey